Taki N'Dio (1896 – 6 May 1935) was a French athlete. He competed in the men's javelin throw at the 1924 Summer Olympics.

References

External links
 

1896 births
1935 deaths
Athletes (track and field) at the 1924 Summer Olympics
Chadian male javelin throwers
French male javelin throwers
Olympic athletes of France
Place of birth missing